Lisa Harvey (born February 7, 1970)
is a Canadian athlete who competed for Canada in the 10,000m (10k) competition of the 1992 Summer Olympics in Barcelona, Spain.

Personal life
Harvey was born in Vancouver, British Columbia. She is married to Paul McCloy, a fellow 10k runner. She and her husband lives in Calgary and has two children.

References

External links

 
 
 
 
 
 

1970 births
Athletes (track and field) at the 1991 Pan American Games
Athletes (track and field) at the 1992 Summer Olympics
Living people
Olympic track and field athletes of Canada
Athletes from Vancouver
Pan American Games silver medalists for Canada
Pan American Games medalists in athletics (track and field)
World Athletics Championships athletes for Canada
Canadian female long-distance runners
Medalists at the 1991 Pan American Games